Hari Narayan Prasad Sah Rauniyar is a Nepali politician and former member of the Nepal House of Representatives. He was elected from Parsa-3 constituency in the 2017 elections, representing Federal Socialist Forum. He was charged with corruption and automatically suspended from parliament in October 2018, after the Commission for Investigation of the Abuse of Authority filed a case against him and 12 others over the negligence and embezzlement in the construction of the Babai river bridge which had collapsed during construction in 2017. He is the former proprietor of Pappu Construction that was building the bridge under government contract.

References

Living people
Nepal MPs 2017–2022
People's Socialist Party, Nepal politicians
1961 births